Gents in a Jam is a 1952 short subject directed by Edward Bernds starring American slapstick comedy team The Three Stooges (Moe Howard, Larry Fine and Shemp Howard). It is the 141st entry in the series released by Columbia Pictures starring the comedians, who released 190 shorts for the studio between 1934 and 1959.

Plot
The Stooges offer to repaint their landlady's apartment in order to avoid being evicted. Landlady Mrs. MacGruder (Kitty McHugh) warns them that the "furnishings cost a pretty penny," so the Stooges destroy her place without fail. Just as they are packing a trunk to leave, Shemp receives a telegram from his Uncle Phineas Bowman (Emil Sitka) who is coming to visit. When Mrs. MacGruder hears the wealthy bachelor Uncle Phineas is worth $6 million, with Shemp his sole heir, she allows the Stooges to stay.

Later, while Shemp is preparing Upside Down Cake, pretty new neighbor Gertie Duggan (Dani Sue Nolan) comes by to borrow a cup of sugar. While making casual conversation, Shemp keeps repeating, "'Duggan', 'Duggan'...I know that name from somewhere." Gertie confirms Shemp's curiosity when she says her husband is tough, professional strongman Rocky Duggan (Mickey Simpson), known for easily tearing thick telephone books for kicks. Within seconds, Gertie takes a fall in the boys' kitchen, leading to Shemp accidentally tearing off her skirt when trying to help her up. Realizing that all three Stooges will be beaten into submission if husband Rocky gets wind of this, they frantically hide Gertie. Just then, Uncle Phineas arrives, and all seems fine until Gertie, now resplendent in Shemp's bathrobe, makes a dash for her apartment. Rocky sees this, and comes barging into the Stooges' apartment, knocking Phineas to the floor.

Just when the towering Rocky is grinding Shemp into powder, Mrs. MacGruder appears and demands Rocky let go of Shemp. He threatens "Beat it, lady. No dame is gonna tell me what to do." Without missing a beat, MacGruder knocks Rocky to the ground with a right hook to the jaw. As Gertie comes running to her husband, she pleads, "Honey, this whole thing was a mistake." "Mistake?" he moans, and then proceeds to spit out his teeth, griping "Look at my choppers!" Mrs. MacGruder then enters the Stooges' apartment to find a weary Uncle Phineas, who turns out to be her childhood sweetheart. While Shemp is promising Rocky new teeth, since he is his uncle's sole heir, Phineas and MacGruder rekindle their romance, and decide to get married, leaving Shemp and the Stooges without an inheritance and Rocky without teeth. Incensed, the strongman chases after the Stooges once more. As they round the corner of the apartment complex, each Stooge plus Rocky races past Uncle Phineas, knocking him down. As the haymaker, Gertie runs right over the fallen uncle, and squarely kicks him in the jaw.

Semi-conscious, Phineas receives a hug from the caring MacGruder, and moans, "All I wanted was a nice, quiet visit."

Cast

Credited
 Moe Howard as Moe
 Larry Fine as Larry
 Shemp Howard as Shemp & Radio (voice)
 Emil Sitka as Phineas Bowman
 Kitty McHugh as Mrs. McGruder
 Dani Sue Nolan as Mrs. Duggan
 Mickey Simpson as Rocky Duggan

Uncredited
 Snub Pollard as Telegram messenger

Production notes
Gents in a Jam was filmed on December 17–19, 1951. It was the last Stooge short directed by Edward Bernds, long considered the Stooges' finest director. Producer Hugh McCollum was discharged and, as a result, Bernds resigned out of loyalty to McCollum, leaving only director/short subject head Jules White to both produce and direct the Stooges' remaining Columbia comedies.

Gents in a Jam marks the final appearance of longtime actor Snub Pollard. The comedy actor appeared in many shorts of the Curly Howard era. This was his final appearance in the Shemp era.

References

External links 
 
 
Gents in a Jam at threestooges.net

1952 films
1952 comedy films
American black-and-white films
Films directed by Edward Bernds
The Three Stooges films
Columbia Pictures short films
American comedy short films
1950s English-language films
1950s American films